Helsingin Jokerit (English: Jokers or Jesters of Helsinki) are a professional ice hockey team based in Helsinki, Finland. The team won six league championships as a member of the Finnish SM-liiga (1973, 1992, 1994, 1996, 1997, and 2002). Jokerit plays its home games at Helsinki Halli. The team was a part of the Bobrov Division of the Kontinental Hockey League (KHL) Western Conference starting in the 2014–15 season, making Finland the first Nordic country to have a team in the league.

On 25 February 2022, Jokerit announced it would withdraw from the 2022 KHL playoffs due to the Russian invasion of Ukraine. Multiple team sponsors including the arena's title sponsor Hartwall announced intentions to end their agreements. On 5 April, Jokerit subsequently announced ending their participation in the KHL completely. And on 20 April, they announced that they are seeking to return to SM-liiga for the 2023–24 season.

History

The beginning

Jokerit would not have existed without the debt-incumbent ice hockey branch of Töölön Vesa amateur sports club, who were faced with having to discontinue their resource-demanding ice hockey activities in 1967. Master-builder Aimo Mäkinen seized the opportunity to establish a semi-professional sports club of his own, and for the price of half of Vesa's ice hockey debts the new ice hockey club inherited everything, including junior players and the vacant position in second highest Finnish series, Suomensarja.

Officially, Jokerit were established on 27 October 1967, at their constitutional meeting. The club's sole owner Mäkinen chose to wield sovereign power, becoming in practice also the board and managing director. The insignia, a winking jester, was adapted from jokers of various card decks and drawn by graphic designer Jorma Hinkka. Their home venue was Helsinki Ice Hall.

Mäkinen did not intend his new club to loiter in the lower series. Even though dramatic changes in the line-up did not appear directly, only a few players from Töölön Vesa saw prolonged employment: Timo Turunen would be the most distinguished, remaining even today as the club's all-time goal scoring leader. With him, Pentti Hiiros and Timo Kyntölä would form nallipyssyketju ("cap gun line", referring to their lack of height – Hiiros was the tallest at 172 cm) until 1975, when the latter retired.

Promotion to SM-sarja

Promotion to the highest level, SM-sarja, took place two years later. Immediately after the promotion was secured, Mäkinen began an aggressive acquisition of star players. Among them were the national team regulars defenceman Ilpo Koskela with forwards Henry Leppä and Timo Sutinen, whose relationship with the club lasted long.

Other, later reinforcements worthy of a mention were forward Jouko Öystilä and defenceman Timo Saari, and finally, head coach Matti Lampainen. In 1969, the IIHF had loosened amateur rules by permitting bodychecking anywhere in the rink (old rules allowed bodychecking only in defensive end). SM-sarja underwent a tactical revolution as physical, mean play became a means to success. Lampainen, however, reckoned physical play unsuitable for the line-up at hand (consider nallipyssyketju). He guided the team, with success, towards a play that demanded technique and clever tactics. This became the trademark of Jokerit that stuck all the way to the late 1990s and resulted in the way Jokerit played as being branded as "neitikiekko", which roughly translates as "playing like women".

To his credit, Mäkinen also enhanced the club's junior organization by launching a competition of their own, called Kanada-sarja, with 500 participating junior players, a figure that cumulatively tripled in a few years. Kanada-sarja didn't survive the 1970s, but Jokerit benefited from it through a steady flow of emerging talent including Jari Kurri, and by gaining a strong popular base in the outer urban zones of Helsinki.

Despite winning Finnish championship silver in 1971 and gold in 1973, Jokerit didn't manage to be financially profitable during Mäkinen's period in charge. He started downsizing the team's budget by methodically replacing departing stars with junior players. Success slowly declined and Jokerit only just managed to avoid relegation from the Finnish elite-level league several times. This, combined with Mäkinen's controversial manner of management – the emphasis being place on non-physical play – led to the club facing an uncertain and turbulent future.

Success and financial troubles
When a replacement candidate turned up in 1980, Mäkinen retired from the ownership, though he went on in the club's junior organization up to the 1990s. New owners, Jokeriklubin Tuki Ry, were a conventional association supervised by its board.

Under new management, the club didn't instantly shake off its wobbliness, but then they peaked for one season. Having signed mainly outcasts of other clubs, they suddenly hit jackpot: for the 1982–83 season, the club signed Soviet Union's national team defenceman Nikolai Makarov. As a result, Jokerit had a near-perfect season and advanced all the way to the SM-Liiga finals, where they were comprehensively beaten by local rival HIFK.

However, the management ran into unexpected financial problems, and the brief success soon withered. Only a few years later, they had to avert bankruptcy twice, which struck a blow to their credibility, as a mass desertion of the players ensued. The first line was a shambles as wing Risto Kerminen departed and center Jari Lindroos almost did, but though he had signed elsewhere, the contract was illegitimately nullified. Few others, apart from the longtime goaltender Rauli Sohlman, remained. Jokerit faced the imminent relegation in 1987.

In the middle of the bleakest hour of their history, with Jokeriklubin Tuki Ry seeking to discontinue their association, new blood was rushed into Jokerit. In 1988, their 20-year-olds won the Finnish junior championship with several prospective stars: defenceman Waltteri Immonen would be captain of the team from 1991 to 1999; Mika Strömberg the club's all-time best-scoring defenceman; Ari Sulander the main goaltender from 1993 to 1998; forward Keijo Säilynoja a goal scorer and a penalty-shot specialist; and Teemu Selänne the National Hockey League (NHL) record-breaker.

Now that the club was spiced with such promising, new willing owners turned up to save them. They established Jokeri-Hockey Oy and became the first limited company based sports club in Finland. Kalervo Kummola, who played the leading role assembling the company, sat in its board up to 2002.

The team, reinforced with the junior champions, orchestrated a quick promotion back to the top level, now called SM-liiga. But once again, despite the phenomenal boost in popularity supported by the prominent scorer Selänne and other young star players, the owners ran into severe financial problems, caused by incompetent management and disagreements within the board.

The Harkimo era
In 1991, an investor withdrew and board member Harry "Hjallis" Harkimo got credentials to a double majority of shares. He appointed himself the chairman of the board, discontinued all managerial positions and nominated his wife Leena Harkimo the managing director (who held the task up to her election to the Parliament of Finland in 1999). This proved to be the final stroke of luck the club needed: the disagreements vanished once and for all and Harry Harkimo established himself as an efficient businessman, being able to conduct a rapid recovery of the economy. In a few years, Jokerit were the wealthiest Finnish sports club.

Thus, they were able to reinforce the team with first class talent. Several successful acquisitions were signed, most memorably Otakar Janecký, who manned the first line center for several seasons, becoming the club's all-time best point scorer; Petri Varis, who became the club's best goal scorer of the 1990s; and forward Antti Törmänen. Together with the above-mentioned junior champions they formed a core of a dynasty of thriving times: Jokerit won the Finnish championship in 1992, 1994, 1996 and 1997, the European Cup in 1995 and 1996, plus Finnish silver once and European bronze once.

Harkimo further converted the club from semi-professionalism towards his ideal of professional sports entertainment, which was unmistakably adopted from the NHL. His efforts yielded Jokerit their own home venue, Hartwall Arena, in 1997 – first such privately owned in Europe. Ownership was reformed into Jokerit HC Oyj, a public limited company. They focused on the new European Hockey League expecting it to evolve into a competition more money-making than SM-Liiga, and sought various other ways to expand. Most of these plans did not meet with success, but the new venue turned out to be a gold-mine for the club's business. Meanwhile, Harry Harkimo tried to create an elite team to the British Ice Hockey Superleague, the Newcastle Jesters, but the team was not as successful as hoped, so he sold the franchise back to the League.

As they set foot at Hartwall Arena, the club signed several star reinforcements seen to be required to win the two professional leagues and to replace the now slightly aged core. However, despite having sparkling line-ups, their performance fluctuated, ending up winning "only" Finnish bronze in 1998. To make matters worse, their closest rival, HIFK won the SM-Liiga title in 1998, the first year that Jokerit had occupied the new Hartwall Arena. The club went on to making a losing appearance in the finals in 2000, and repeatedly failed to achieve success in the European Hockey League (which turned out as a major flop in itself).

Into the next millennium
In the 2000s, the management have regained what the supporters consider more reasonable an attitude by concentrating back on SM-Liiga, but the line-ups have had a notable turnover rate between seasons – a distinct core has not developed or been preserved.

For the 1999–2000 season, Jokerit had a good team. The team featured good players like German international Jan Benda, Russian Dmitri Kvartalnov, Czech Miroslav Hlinka, longtime Jokerit alumni Petri Varis, Finnish top players Antti-Jussi Niemi, Tom Koivisto and Pasi Nurminen on goal. The team was soon joined by former NHL playersTuomas Grönman and the five-time Stanley Cup champion Esa Tikkanen. The team was strong and reached the finals, but lost to TPS three games to one.

Jokerit did not have much success in the following season although they had players like Jukka Hentunen and Antti Törmänen to strengthen the team.

In 2001–02, the team featured players like Pavel Rosa, Frank Banham, and 1995 world champion Ville Peltonen. With Kari Lehtonen's terrific form between the pipes and the arrival of Vladimir Machulda from SaiPa, Jokerit won their sixth Finnish championship in 2002.

Kari Lehtonen, the starting goaltender for the Dallas Stars (NHL), played for Jokerit in 2001. At 21 years old, he was the youngest goaltender to play in SM-liiga.

The 2002–03 and 2003–04 seasons yielded no medals for Jokerit. In the spring of 2003, Jokerit acquired forward Glen Metropolit from the Washington Capitals (NHL) organization; despite his unimpressive NHL record, Metropolit became the scoring leader for Jokerit in both the 2003–04 regular season and playoffs, as well as the 2004–05 regular season. Metropolit became a firm fan favorite, and many were sorry to see him leave the Finnish league after the 2004–05 season. Another important Jokerit acquisition was goalie Tim Thomas from the Boston Bruins (NHL) organization. Thomas played in every game of the season bar two with a save percentage of 94.59% and a record-breaking 15 shutouts, for which he won the Kultainen kypärä award.

As the 2004–05 NHL lockout was extended, Jokerit hired Brian Campbell, and Ossi Väänänen returned to his hometown team from the Colorado Avalanche in December. Teemu Selänne officially joined the Jokerit lineup in December, but he spent the spring rehabbing his injured knee and was unable to play any games for the team. With a strong team, Jokerit looked set to win the regular season and take the championship when an inexplicable late-season collapse allowed Kärpät to take and keep the regular season lead. The two teams faced off in the finals, with Jokerit losing three games to one and having to settle for the silver.

After the 2005 NHL lockout
When the NHL lockout ended in 2005, many players were lost to NHL teams and to other teams in Europe: Campbell, Väänänen, Selänne, Metropolit, Pasi Häkkinen, Valtteri Filppula and Tomi Mäki. The last departure occurred just one day before regular season play started, when goaltender Tim Thomas signed with the Boston Bruins. Jokerit tried to replace the loss of Thomas with goalkeeper Karl Goehring but Goehring was released soon and replaced by an ex-NHL player Steve Passmore. Passmore was paired mid-season with HIFK's Tom Askey but none of the three was able to fill the empty spot of Tim Thomas. Jokerit also had players like Eric Beaudoin and Justin Mapletoft but neither of them made a positive impact during the season. The spree of departures, combined with rookie coach Waltteri Immonen's coaching debut, led Jokerit to an abysmal early season, with a win–loss–tie record of 5–11–4 after 20 games. Immonen, a long-time Jokerit player but a rookie head coach, was moved from the job in November and Curt Lindström was hired to salvage the team. Mr. Lindström could not change the course of the team and for the first time in 16 years, Jokerit did not qualify for the playoffs.

The Shedden Era
After their worst season ranking in decades, Jokerit acquired the services of HIFK head coach and former NHL player Doug Shedden. Shedden brought in a key player from HIFK, Kim Hirschovits, who had gained responsibility under Shedden in his former team. The refreshed team also featured Jyrki Louhi from the 2005–06 champions HPK and Juuso Riksman from Ässät, the second placed team of 2006. Jokerit acquired some scoring talent in the form of Tim Stapleton and some NHL-experience as Shedden's former protege from Toronto-era Clarke Wilm moved to Jokerit mid-season. Shedden's first Jokerit season was good as the team returned to the play-offs and infamously defeated the reigning champions HPK in the semi-finals to advance to the finals against Kärpät. Although Jokerit lost to Kärpät in the finals, the 2006–07 season was a good start for Shedden in Jokerit. During the 2007–08 season, Jokerit celebrated their 40th anniversary and on 27 October, Jokerit retired the jersey of former alumni Jari Kurri. Jokerit strengthened their goaltending department by acquiring former NHL and Finnish national team goaltender Jussi Markkanen to replace Scott Langkow before the season and added more NHL experience by contracting former Atlanta Thrashers and Vancouver Canucks center Tommi Santala after the season had started. During the 2007–08 SM-liiga season, Doug Shedden announced that he had been contracted to the Swiss team EV Zug and was leaving Jokerit after the season. After a while, it was announced that Shedden's job as the head coach of the team would be taken over by ex-NHL head coach Glen Hanlon after Shedden's contract was to expire. Shedden's last season as the head coach of Jokerit ended worse than expected. Although Jokerit were predicted to be championship contenders, they lost a 3–1 lead in the series against Espoo Blues and lost the series 3 games to 4. Jokerit was dropped to the bronze medal game where they lost to Tappara, thus finishing fourth in SM-liiga for the 2007–08 season. Along with Shedden, Jokerit also lost the services of assistant coach Waltteri Immonen as he followed Shedden to EV Zug.

Glen Hanlon takes over

The former head coach of the Belarus national team and the Washington Capitals, Glen Hanlon, followed Doug Shedden as the head coach for Jokerit at the start of the 2008–09 season. Although fresh from the SM-liiga playoffs, Jokerit announced several signings for the season. Jokerit contracted former Jokerit and Dallas Stars player Juha Lind, former American Hockey League (AHL) players Janne Lahti along with Tomi Mäki and enforcer and fighter Pasi Nielikäinen. Former Jokerit and Frölunda HC defenseman Tom Koivisto was signed to add some offensive touch to the Jokerit defence and Antti Hulkkonen was signed for his experience. The goalkeeper Juuso Riksman returned to Jokerit after a one-year visit to North America and the AHL, replacing Jussi Markkanen who joined HC CSKA Moscow of the Russian Superleague (RSL).

The team organization of Jokerit also had some changes after 2007–08 season. The team's general manager Matti Virmanen was moved to work as the director of sports activities for Jokerit, and was replaced as the general manager by former Jokerit-alumni and Finnish international player, Keijo Säilynoja, who started as the general manager for Jokerit on 15 June 2008. Jokerit lost their 2008 preseason game against the NHL's Pittsburgh Penguins 4–1. This was the second time Jokerit had faced an NHL team, the first being the 2003–04 game against the Toronto Maple Leafs.

2009–10 season

Jokerit announced that Hanlon would not be coaching the team, but a former Jokerit head coach from 1993 to 1996, Hannu Aravirta, took over again. The season started badly and they were placed last for some time. Pretty quickly after season start, Jokerit started the 2009–10 season by acquiring Fredrik Bremberg, Alex Brooks, Michael Nylander and Bates Battaglia. On 25 November, Aravirta was sacked and replaced by Hannu Jortikka, who had coached the team in 2003–2005. Jortikka also failed and Jokerit was the last team to qualify for the playoffs' wild card -round. Jokerit's season ended rapidly losing the wild card series 2–1 to Tappara.

KHL era (2014–2022)

On 28 June 2013, Harkimo arranged a press conference, where he stated that he had sold Hartwall Arena, the home rink of Jokerit to Finnish–Russian businessmen Gennady Timchenko (president of SKA Saint Petersburg), Arkady Rotenberg (chairman of HC Dynamo Moscow) and Boris Rotenberg (co-owner of SKA), along with an option to buy a share of the team after the 2013–14 season. It was also announced that Jokerit will leave the SM-liiga after the 2013–14 season and start in the Kontinental Hockey League (KHL) for the 2014–15 season. Harkimo would remain majority owner and manager of the team. Jari Kurri was named as the team's new general manager.

In the 2016–17 KHL season, Jokerit drew an average home attendance of 9,610, the highest of all Nordic ice hockey clubs.

In May 2019, general manager Kurri became the sole owner of the team. Before that, former majority owner Harry Harkimo had bought all the shares from minor owners Gennady Timchenko and the Rotenbergs, which along his previously owned shares, he sold to Kurri.

In the 2017–18 KHL season, Jokerit and HIFK arranged an outdoor event, called the Helsinki Ice Challenge, where Jokerit met SKA Saint Petersburg at Kaisaniemi Park in Helsinki, Finland on 2 December 2017. SKA won the game 4–3, but Jokerit set a new KHL single game attendance record with 17,645 fans attending the game. On 22 March 2018, in a playoff game against CSKA Moscow, Jokerit was involved in the longest game in KHL history, finally prevailing 2–1 with the winning goal being scored at 2:09 of the 5th overtime period, after 142:09 of play.

On 25 February 2022, Jokerit announced they would forgo the KHL playoffs due to the Russian invasion of Ukraine. After Russia invaded Ukraine, many sponsors left the team and fans in Finland demanded Jokerit leave the KHL league and return to play in Finland. There have been boycotts towards the team's home arena. Also Jokerit began to offer players to Finnish league teams, and soon the team's head coach moved to Oulun Kärpät. On 5 April, Jokerit officially announced that they are withdrawing from the league and will no longer continue playing for the KHL. Jokerit said team president Kurri had left his post on the KHL board and the team would announce future plans for competition "as soon as possible."

Post-KHL era (2022–present)
On 20 April 2022, Jokerit announced that they are seeking to return to SM-liiga for the 2023–24 season. 

in 2023 Jokerit submitted an application for a league place for Mestis season 2023–2024. At the end of February, the federal government of the Finnish Ice Hockey Federation granted the Jokerit a conditional place in the league for Mestis next season. The ice hockey association requires that the background company of the Jokerit representative team implements the ownership arrangements and main ownership as described in its application for a league place by the end of March, when it must in turn submit Mestis' license application. Jokerit plans to play most of its home games in the 2023-2024 Mestis season at the Kerava Ice Hall, which meets the league's requirements. The audience capacity of the hall is approximately 1,500 spectators. The team also plans to play some of its home games at the Helsinki Ice Hall.

Season-by-season record
Note: GP = Games played, W = Wins, OTW = Overtime or shootout wins, OTL = Overtime or shootout losses, L = Losses, Pts = Points, GF = Goals for, GA = Goals against, PIM = Penalties in minutes

Players

Team captains

Osmo Kuusisto 1967–1969
Erkki Mononen 1969–1971
Timo Turunen 1971–1976, 1978
Pentti Hiiros 1976–1978
Jari Kapanen 1978–1980
Henry Leppä 1980–1981
Jussi Lepistö 1981–1982, 1987
Risto Kerminen 1982–1984
Markus Lehto 1984–1985
Jari Lindroos 1985–1987
Jarmo Koskinen 1987–1989
Anssi Melametsä 1989–1990
Waltteri Immonen 1991–1999
Antti-Jussi Niemi 1999–2000, 2009–2010
Antti Törmänen 2000–2002
Ville Peltonen 2001–2002, 2002–2003
Sami Helenius 2003–2004
Juha Lind 2004–05
Petri Varis 2005, 2006–2009
Marko Jantunen 2005–2006
Ossi Väänänen 2010–2014
Niko Kapanen 2014–2016
Peter Regin 2016–2020
Marko Anttila 2020–2022

Retired numbers

Coaches

Current staff
 Head Coach:
 Assistant Coach:
 Assistant Coach:

All-time head coaches

 Jorma Salmi 1967–1968
 Martti Sarlin 1968–1969 (half season)
 Jorma Kyntölä 1968–1969 (half season)
 Aulis Hirvonen 1969–1970
 Matti Lampainen 1970–1973, 1973–1974
 Rauli Virtanen 1973
/ Boris Majorov 1974–1976, 1990–1993
 Jorma Borgström 1976–1977
 Pentti Katainen 1977–1978
 Timo Turunen 1978
 Matti Väisänen 1978–1980, 1985–1987
 Olli Hietanen 1980–1982
 Reino Ruotsalainen 1982–1985
 Henry Leppä 1987–1988
 Kari Mäkinen 1988–1990
 Alpo Suhonen 1993
 Hannu Aravirta 1993–1996
 Curt Lundmark 1996–1997, 1997–1998
 Sakari Pietilä 1997
 Hannu Kapanen 1998–1999
 Timo Lahtinen 1999
 Erkka Westerlund 1999–2001, 2010–2012, 2014–2016
 Raimo Summanen 2001–2003
 Hannu Jortikka 2003–2005, 2009–2010
 Waltteri Immonen 2005
 Curt Lindström 2005–2006
 Doug Shedden 2006–2008
 Glen Hanlon 2008–2009
 Hannu Aravirta 2009
 Tomi Lämsä 2012–2014 (half a season)
/ Tomek Valtonen 2014 (half a season)
 Jukka Jalonen 2016–2018
 Lauri Marjamäki 2018–2022

Honours

Team awards
Domestic
 SM-sarja Kanada-malja: 1973
 SM-liiga Kanada-malja: 1992, 1994, 1996, 1997, 2002
 SM-sarja Kanada-malja: 1971
 SM-liiga Kanada-malja: 1983, 1995, 2000, 2005, 2007
 SM-liiga Kanada-malja: 1998, 2012

International
 IIHF European Cup: 1994, 1995
 IIHF European Cup: 1992
 IIHF Continental Cup: 2003
 European Trophy (1): 2011
 Tournament Hameenlinna: 2014
 Puchkov Cup: 2014, 2016
 Puchkov Cup: 2017
 Puchkov Cup: 2015
 Bauer games: 2020, 2021

Other awards
Aaro Kivilinnan Memorial Trophy (Best Finnish Club age classes combined): 1976, 1996, 1997 (shared), 1998, 1999, 2000, 2003
Harry Lindblad Trophy (SM-liiga regular season winner, since 1975): 1983, 1995, 1996, 1997, 2001, 2013
I-Divisioona / Suomensarja, promotion to top league. (it was the second level of ice hockey in Finland): 1969, 1989

Individual awards

Kultainen kypärä
Teemu Selänne – 1991
Tim Thomas – 2005
Ville Leino – 2008
Juuso Riksman – 2009

Urpo Ylönen Trophy
Rauli Sohlman – 1983
Ari Sulander – 1996
Kari Lehtonen – 2002, 2003
 Juuso Riksman – 2009

Pekka Rautakallio Trophy
Nikolai Makarov – 1983
Erik Hämäläinen – 1993
Mika Strömberg – 1996

Jarmo Wasama Memorial Trophy
Teemu Pulkkinen – 2011
Teuvo Teräväinen – 2012

Veli-Pekka Ketola Trophy
Timo Turunen – 1973
Timo Sutinen – 1974, 1975
Petri Varis – 1997, 2001

Aarne Honkavaara Trophy
Timo Turunen – 1973, 1974 (shared)
Teemu Selänne – 1992
Petri Varis – 1997
Pasi Saarela – 1999
Jani Rita – 2007
Jukka Hentunen – 2010 (shared)

Raimo Kilpiö Trophy
Jari Kapanen – 1975
Teemu Selänne – 1991
Keijo Säilynoja – 1992
Waltteri Immonen – 1996
Ville Peltonen – 2003

Matti Keinonen Trophy
Arto Sirviö – 1984
Waltteri Immonen – 1992
Erik Hämäläinen – 1993
Petri Varis – 1996
Martti Järventie – 2007

Kalevi Numminen Trophy
Reino Ruotsalainen – 1983
Raimo Summanen – 2002

Other achievements:
In the 2004–05 season, Tim Thomas broke the SM-liiga shutout record with 15 shutouts during the regular season.
Nine European players in the history of the National Hockey League have scored 1,000 career points; two of these nine, and the only Finns, Jari Kurri and Teemu Selänne, started their professional careers with Jokerit.
In the 2015–16 KHL season, Jokerit won the Bobrov Division in just their second season in the league.

References

External links

  

 
Former Liiga teams
Sports clubs in Helsinki
Ice hockey clubs established in 1967
1967 establishments in Finland
Former Kontinental Hockey League teams
Ice hockey teams in Finland
Bobrov Division (KHL)
Liiga